Alangium kurzii is a tree in the family Cornaceae. It is named for the German naturalist Wilhelm Sulpiz Kurz.

Description
The smooth bark is dark grey. The flowers are pale greenish to creamy yellow.

Distribution and habitat
Alangium kurzii grows naturally from China to western Malesia. Its habitat is lowland to submontane forests from sea-level to  altitude.

References

kurzii
Trees of China
Trees of Indo-China
Trees of Malesia
Plants described in 1911
Taxa named by William Grant Craib